{{Infobox cultivar
| name = 'Canadian Reinette' apple
| image = Reinette_grise_du_Canada_p1160060.jpg
| image_caption = 'Reinette Grise du Canada', 
probably a sub-cultivar
| genus = Malus
| species = Malus pumila| hybrid = Old French cultivar
| cultivar = 'Canadian Reinette'
| origin = , before 1771
}}Reinette du Canada or Canadian Reinette''' is, despite its name, an old French cultivar of domesticated apple. It is a reinette type of golden apple, with much russeting, which keeps shape in cooking and is mainly used for that purpose especially in apple strudel.

Even today it is considered as the default russet apple of France, and is also known as the Reinette Blanche du Canada and many more names. Reinette Grise du Canada'' is probably also a sub cultivar of it, but this is not clear. Reinette du Canada, or whatever name it has, likely originated in Normandy, France and was first described in 1771.

The fruit is tart and mostly used for cooking if picked early and used quickly; if stored for some time it gets softer and sweeter hence more recommended for fresh eating. It blossoms approximately three days after the Cox's Orange Pippin.

See also
 Golden Russet

References

External links

Apple cultivars